Viti (Biti) or Vötö (Bötö), also known as Nde-Gbite, is a Narrow Grassfields language of Nigeria, spoken in the village of Antere in Taraba State, half a kilometre from the Cameroonian border. It is not clear how close or distinct it is from other Grassfields varieties.

References 

Grassfields Bantu languages
Languages of Nigeria